Bodenstein is a German surname. Notable people with the surname include:

Christel Bodenstein (born 1938), German actress
Corne Bodenstein (born 1992), South African-born cricketer for Jersey
Dietrich H. Bodenstein (1908-1984), German-American entomologist
Max Bodenstein (1871–1942), German chemist
Andreas Bodenstein, early Protestant reformer

See also
Adam von Bodenstein (1528–1577), Swiss Paracelsian alchemist and physician

German-language surnames